Lydon is a surname of Irish origin, an anglicization of "Loideán", and may refer to:

Alexander Francis Lydon (1836–1917), English engraver of natural history
Alexandra Lydon (born 1979), Irish and American television actress
Christopher Lydon (born 1940), American media personality and author
Don Lydon (born 1938), Irish psychologist and former politician in Ireland
James Francis Lydon (1928–2013), Irish historian
Jimmy Lydon (born 1923), American movie actor and television producer
Joe Lydon (1878–1937), American welterweight boxer
Joe Lydon (born 1963), English rugby league footballer and rugby union coach
John Lydon (born 1956) also known as Johnny Rotten, British rock musician
Joseph Patrick Lydon (1878–1937), American welterweight boxer
William A. Lydon (1863–1918), founded the Great Lakes Dredge and Dock Company

Surnames of Irish origin
English-language surnames
Anglicised Irish-language surnames